The 2009 Memphis Tigers football team represented the University of Memphis in the 2009 NCAA Division I FBS college football season. The Tigers, led by 9th year head coach Tommy West, played their home games at the Liberty Bowl Memorial Stadium. Memphis finished the season 2–10 and 1–7 in CUSA play. Head coach Tommy West was fired at the end of the season. Top players included running back Curtis Steele, who was named Offensive Player of the Year for the second season in a row.

Schedule

References

Memphis
Memphis Tigers football seasons
Memphis Tigers football